The 2019 English football summer transfer window ran from 16 May to 8 August 2019. Players without a club may be signed at any time, clubs may sign players on loan dependent on their league's regulations, and clubs may sign a goalkeeper on an emergency loan if they have no registered senior goalkeeper available. This list includes transfers featuring at least one club from either the Premier League or the EFL Championship that were completed after the end of the winter 2018–19 transfer window on 31 January and before the end of the 2019 summer window.

Transfers
All players and clubs without a flag are English. Note that while Cardiff City and Swansea City are affiliated with the Football Association of Wales and thus take the Welsh flag, they play in the Championship, and so their transfers are included here.

Loans

References

England
Summer 2019